A list of notable photographers from Slovenia:

B
Irena Blühová
Boštjan Burger

K
Gojmir Anton Kos

L
Matevž Lenarčič
Marijan Lipovšek

M
Marko Modic

P
Veno Pilon
Ernest Pogorelc
Marko Prezelj
Janez Avguštin Puhar
Benka Pulko

R
Janko Ravnik

 
Photographer
Slovenian